María Paloma Adrados Gautier (born 16 April 1957) is a Spanish politician of the People's Party, mayoress of Pozuelo de Alarcón between 2011 and 2015, and, since then, president of the Madrid Assembly until 2019, when she became First Deputy President.

Biography
After graduating in Law, she began working in the CEOE, taking responsibility for the International Labor Relations Area. After passing through the International Labour Organization as a consultant, She entered fully into politics, joining the ranks of the Popular Party (PP). Between 1997 and 1999 she worked under Javier Arenas, at that time Minister of Labor and Social Affairs, as an advisor. In 1999 she was elected regional deputy of the Assembly of Madrid, and occupied the position of first secretary of the board.

In June 2007 she was chosen by Esperanza Aguirre to replace Juan José Güemes at the head of the Ministry of Employment and Women of Government of the Community of Madrid.

In 2011, she was elected candidate of her party to run for mayor of the city of Pozuelo de Alarcón, reaching 61.9% of the votes in the May 2011 elections,  being mayor on 11 June 2011

In 2015, she again attended the municipal elections of Pozuelo as a candidate, as well as the regional elections. His party lost 3 councilors in the municipal and although he maintained the majority, Adrados did not take possession and resigned from the act of councilor to assume the presidency of the Assembly of Madrid.

References

1957 births
Living people
20th-century Spanish lawyers
People's Party (Spain) politicians
Government ministers of the Community of Madrid
Women mayors of places in Spain
Presidents of the Assembly of Madrid
First Secretaries of the Assembly of Madrid
Members of the 5th Assembly of Madrid
Members of the 6th Assembly of Madrid
Members of the 7th Assembly of Madrid
Members of the 8th Assembly of Madrid
Members of the 10th Assembly of Madrid
21st-century Spanish women politicians
Politicians from Madrid
Complutense University of Madrid alumni
Members of the People's Parliamentary Group (Assembly of Madrid)
Members of the 11th Assembly of Madrid
Mayors of places in the Community of Madrid
City councillors in the Community of Madrid
Pozuelo de Alarcón